The 1956 West Texas State Buffaloes football team was an American football team that represented West Texas State College (now known as West Texas A&M University) in the Border Conference during the 1956 NCAA University Division football season. In its tenth season under head coach Frank Kimbrough, the team compiled an 8–2 record (2–2 against conference opponents), finished in third place in the conference, defeated Mississippi Southern in the 1957 Tangerine Bowl, and outscored all opponents by a total of 296 to 96. The team played its home games at Buffalo Stadium in Canyon, Texas.

The team averaged 29.6 points per game, ranking third among 111 major college programs for the 1956 season.

The team's statistical leaders included Bubba Hillman with 357 passing yards, Ron Mills with 569 rushing yards, Ken Ballard with 125 receiving yards, and Charles Sanders with 12 touchdowns.

Schedule

References

West Texas State
West Texas A&M Buffaloes football seasons
Citrus Bowl champion seasons
West Texas State Buffaloes football